IronFall: Invasion is a third-person shooter video game developed and released by VD-Dev for the Nintendo 3DS. The game was released in Europe and Australasia on February 13, 2015 and in North America on February 26, 2015. It was primarily developed in assembly language. IronFall: Invasion is VD-dev's first original intellectual property.

Gameplay
The game has a single player mode along with multiplayer support. Both modes can either be purchased separately or together. The game plays similarly to a lot of other third person shooters at the time, using a cover system and regenerating health (represented on the bottom screen of the 3ds with a heart rate counter as well as a colour, red signifying being close to death). You could reload more quickly and load extra ammo in your mag by pressing the reload button a second time, similar to Gears of War's active reload system.

The enemies are mostly metal robots, although they are referenced as aliens in the game. They all have names starting with dyx, such as dyxide. 

The enemy types are:

- Standard enemies with assault rifles;

- Smaller flying enemies;

- Tankier enemies with shields that cover their fronts (but can be destroyed with bullets);

- Snipers with laser sights;

- Four legged slower tankier bots; and

- A big drilling worm.

The weapons the player can use are:

- An assault rifle;

- A pistol;

- An energy assault rifle;

- A rocket launcher; and

- A grenade launcher.

The player can choose between easy, normal and hard difficulties. The game autosaves frequently with a lot of checkpoints.

Development
Details on IronFall: Invasion were first shared on October 17, 2013 by Nintendo Everything. The game was shown as a tech demo on November 4, 2013.

On January 14, 2015, the game was revealed during a Nintendo Direct presentation and was confirmed to be out February 2015 as a free-to-start title for all Nintendo 3DS users, with enhanced support for the New Nintendo 3DS console. The free-to-start version allows players limited access to the multiplayer campaign, whilst only making the first map in the single-player campaign playable until a certain point. The game gives the player the choice to purchase the full version of each campaign independently, or both campaigns collectively.

Reception

Overall, Ironfall: Invasion received average reviews by critics, with an aggregate Metacritic score of 48/100.

In late March 2015, VD-Dev announced that the game had been downloaded 300,000 times.

3DS homebrew exploit 
On July 27, 2015, Jordan "Smealum" Rabet, the developer of the Cubic Ninja exploit, announced a new version of the homebrew exploit, with the same features. On July 31, Rabet confirmed that the game the exploit was found in was IronFall: Invasion. On August 11, Nintendo temporarily delisted the game off the Nintendo eShop, as to prevent the exploit from spreading further. Six days later, Rabet released his exploit. On October 13, IronFall: Invasion returned to the eShop with "Update Data", which prevents the exploit from being used. As of January 15, 2016, the exploit has been patched on system menu 10.4.0-29 which released the same day. When trying to load the game, the system does not allow users to launch the title until the software is updated, forcing users to download the patch, rendering the exploit unusable even if the older version of the game is available.

References

External links
 

2015 video games
Nintendo 3DS eShop games
Nintendo 3DS-only games
Nintendo 3DS games
Nintendo Network games
Third-person shooters
Multiplayer and single-player video games
Assembly language software
Video games developed in France